Oh Dae-hwan (born July 5, 1979) is a South Korean actor. He appeared in TV series such as Squad 38 (2016), Shopaholic Louis (2016), Radiant Office (2017), and The Red Sleeve (2021).

Filmography

Film

Television

Television show

Awards and nominations

References

External links

1979 births
Living people
People from Cheonan
21st-century South Korean male actors
South Korean male television actors
South Korean male film actors
South Korean male stage actors
Korea National University of Arts alumni